The Bitter Orange is a 2007 Moroccan film directed by Bouchra Ijork starring Houda Rihani and Youssef Joundy set in Asilah in the 1980s. The film was first aired on television during Ramadan of 2007 on 2M.

Plot 
The story of the film revolves around a girl who falls in love with a police officer who catches her picking bitter oranges. The officer's marriage to someone else causes her much suffering.

Cast
 Houda Rihani
 Youssef Joundy
 Abdellah Lamrani
 Fadila Benmoussa
 Rim Chemaou
 Nouria Benbrahim
 Souad Saber
 Soumaya Amghar
 Farida Bouaazaoui
 Kenza Fridou

Production 
Bouchra Ijork cites the support she received from Mohamed Abderrahman Tazi as vital. Ijork sought to present authentic Moroccanness in all details of the film: clothing, decoration, makeup, and music. She also cited criticisms of Moroccan love stories as lacking emotional expression as a driving source of inspiration to prove the opposite.

Influence 
The film The Bitter Orange made of its stars Houda Rihani and Youssef Joundy an in-demand on-screen couple.

Soundtrack 
K'lma, a duet with Sakina Lafdaili and Fayçal Azizi, performed the song "Warda 'Ala Warda" ( "Rose Upon Rose").

References 

Moroccan drama films
2007 films
2007 television films